Terry James Lee (born March 13, 1962) is an American former Major League Baseball (MLB) first baseman. He played during two seasons for the Cincinnati Reds.

Attended and graduated from Winston Churchill High School (Eugene, Oregon) in 1980. Lee played basketball at Boise State University from 1982-83.

References

External links

1962 births
Living people
Cincinnati Reds players
Nashville Sounds players
Colorado Springs Sky Sox players
Major League Baseball first basemen
Baseball players from San Francisco
Vermont Reds players
Winnipeg Goldeyes players
Chemeketa Storm baseball players
Boise State Broncos baseball players
Cedar Rapids Reds players
Chattanooga Lookouts players
Denver Zephyrs players
Eugene Emeralds players
Greensboro Hornets players
Piratas de Campeche players
Portland Beavers players
American expatriate baseball players in Canada
American expatriate baseball players in Mexico